Deli Barik-e Rudbal (also Romanized as Delī Bārīk-e Rūdbāl; also known as Delī Bārīk) is a village in Charam Rural District, in the Central District of Charam County, Kohgiluyeh and Boyer-Ahmad Province, Iran. At the 2006 census, its population was 192, in 37 families.

References 

Populated places in Charam County